, also known by the abbreviation , is a Japanese manga series written and illustrated by Asato Mizu. It depicts slice of life stories about a group of characters who work in a fictional doujin shop called , a reference to the real-life doujin shop . It was serialized in Media Factory's Comic Flapper magazine from June 2011 to November 2017. A drama CD was released in August 2013. An anime television series adaptation produced by Shin-Ei Animation aired from October to December 2014.

Characters

Umanohone Bookstore

Hiotan is a part-time clerk at Umanohone. Her nickname comes from the fact that she is not an otaku, but is interested in yaoi. Unlike the others, she does not know much about anime. Hiotan acts innocent towards things that are perverted, but admits that she is "someone who really likes porn books." She is easily embarrassed and often teased by Kantoku, whom she has a crush on.

Another clerk at Umanohone, Sensei is an aspiring manga artist under the pen name . Her nickname comes from the fact that she aims to become a great manga artist. Along with Sommelier, she is an avid reader of manga. Compared to Hiotan who is feminine, Sensei always dresses haphazardly, as she is not confident with her appearance and "Girl Power". When exhausted and over-worked, she becomes childish and has Hiotan calm her. She has a crush on Umio.

One of the female clerks at Umanohone, Fu Girl is a 16-year-old high school girl who has the appearance and voice of a shy girl; this changes, however, when she sees something zombie themed or feels as though she is in charge. She's obsessive with zombies and even has prepared if one day there's a zombie outbreak. She sees Umio as person who sacrifices himself in a zombie outbreak and becomes one thus, she becomes violent to him. She has a crush on Sommelier.

One of the female clerks at Umanohone, Kameko is a girl obsessed with cameras. She often captures pictures of Umanohone and its staff, but she has no confidence having her picture taken, as she stated that she is "not one for the spotlight". Her nickname can also mean turtle, explained the keychain on her camera. Kameko also seems to dislike when people try to take her hat off, as seen by Kantoku, whom she has a crush on.

Newest employee of Umanohone. The straight man of the group that hasn't been given a nickname (and when they made one, it does not stick with them), though he becomes a different person when it comes to manga and anime, particularly 2D girls. He is a fan of "Jonatarou" and usually helps her with her manga. He is also a fan of Tsumorin. He and Sensei might be taking liking at each other. He has a younger sister who is a fujoshi.

Another clerk of Umanohone. He often records his employees on his video camera, especially Hiotan, and he got his nickname because he wanted to become a film director. He likes teasing the other employees, particularly Hiotan and Umio. He has a boob and underwear fetish. He used to be in a relationship with Tsumorin and according to her, Kantoku will tease and be mean but sometimes nice to the girl he likes. It seems that he and Hiotan have taken a liking to each other.

A tall man with a big figure, Sommelier is another clerk at Umanohone. He has a profound knowledge of manga, and can match people to the suitable manga for them to read. A "Sommelier Meeting" is regularly held where he recommends manga to a lot of people. He is popular with the ladies. He was classmates with Erohon G-Man in elementary school. He later confessed his love to Fu Girl and they started dating.

Manager of Umanohone. In the anime, he only appears at every next episode preview and is seen talking only at the first and last episode.

Others

A former clerk at Umanohone, now a light novel writer under the pen name . She loves to drink but is easily drunk. She and Kantoku used to be in a relationship and she held on to her unrequited feelings for him, but she also knows that Kantoku is in love with Hiotan.

A woman from the local government (Tokyo Youth Development Counselor) who often comes to inspect porn books (Ero Hon) for compliance with rules and regulations as they relate to adult materials. However, she loves yaoi books. She has a crush on Sommelier.

Fu Girl's younger brother who is still a middle high school sophomore. He calls his sister Haru.

Umio's younger sister who is in junior high. She is a big fujoshi who always connects things to yaoi situations.

Media

Manga
Denkigai no Hon'ya-san, written and illustrated by Asato Mizu, was serialized in Media Factory's Comic Flapper magazine from June 4, 2011 to November 4, 2017. Media Factory published fifteen tankōbon volumes from November 22, 2011 to December 22, 2017. The manga is also published by Ever Glory Publishing in Taiwan.

Drama CD
A drama CD titled , produced by Hobirecords, was released on August 5, 2013 and was limited to being sold in Comic Toranoana stores. The script was written by Asato Mizu and Chabō Higurashi.

Anime
The anime television series adaptation was produced by Shin-Ei Animation and directed by Masafumi Sato. It aired from October 2 to December 18, 2014. The anime is licensed by Pony Canyon's North American label Ponycan USA, and the series streamed on Crunchyroll the same day it premiered in Japan.

Episode list

Reception
As of June 2017, the manga had over 1 million copies in print.

See also
Aharen-san wa Hakarenai – Another manga series by the same author

Notes

References

External links
  
  
 

2011 manga
2014 anime television series debuts
2014 Japanese television series endings
Anime series based on manga
Kadokawa Dwango franchises
Manga creation in anime and manga
Media Factory manga
Pony Canyon
Romantic comedy anime and manga
Seinen manga
Shin-Ei Animation
Tokyo MX original programming